Groovy Hate Fuck is an EP by American noise rock band Pussy Galore, released in June 1986 by Shove Records.

Accolades

Track listing

Personnel
Adapted from the Groovy Hate Fuck liner notes.

Pussy Galore
 Julie Cafritz – electric guitar, vocals
 Neil Hagerty – electric guitar, vocals
 John Hammill – drums, percussion
 Jon Spencer – lead vocals, electric guitar, percussion

Additional musicians
 Rick Hall – percussion (A2)
 Tom Raferty – percussion (A1)
Production and additional personnel
 Barrett Jones – recording
 Cristina Martinez – photography, tambourine (A1)
 Pussy Galore – production

Release history

References

External links 
 

1986 EPs
Pussy Galore (band) albums